Alife may refer to:

 Alife, Campania, Italy; a comune in the Italian province of Caserta
 Diocese of Alife, historical Catholic diocese centered on Alife
 Artificial life, sometimes abbreviated ALife
"Alife" (song), a song by Robert Wyatt from the album Rock Bottom

See also
 Alife Cathedral in Alife, Italy
 Allifae, ancient Italian city located at modern Alife
 Alfie (disambiguation)